Amata atricornuta  is a species of moth of the family Erebidae first described by Max Gaede in 1926. It is found in Australia.

References 

atricornuta
Moths described in 1926
Moths of Australia